John Glyndwr Ashton (born March 31, 1935) was a provincial level politician from Alberta, Canada. He served as a member of the Legislative Assembly of Alberta from 1971 to 1975 sitting with the governing Progressive Conservative caucus.

Political career
Ashton ran for a seat to the Alberta Legislature in the 1971 Alberta general election. He won the new electoral district of Edmonton-Ottewell in a landslide to pick it up for the Progressive Conservative party who went on to form government in that election.

Ashton ran for a second term in office in the 1975 Alberta general election. He won an even larger victory defeating two other candidates to hold his seat. He retired from provincial politics at dissolution of the Assembly in 1979.

He is the current President of Sherwood Park Heritage Mile Society.

Accomplishments

The Book of John: A Life Story of John Glyndwr Ashton, published in 2022, chronicles John Glyndwr Ashton's Life.

References

External links
Legislative Assembly of Alberta Members Listing

Progressive Conservative Association of Alberta MLAs
Living people
1935 births